Kepler is a novel by John Banville, first published in 1981.

In Kepler Banville recreates Prague despite never having been there when he wrote it. A historical novel, it won the 1981 Guardian Fiction Prize.

References

1981 novels
Novel
Historical novels
Novels by John Banville
Secker & Warburg books